Winds of Chance is a 1925 American silent drama film directed by Frank Lloyd and produced and released by First National Pictures.

Plot
As described in a film magazine reviews, when Pierce Phillips finds he has no money to meet the government’s requirements in seeking gold, he works as a packer of supplies for other adventure seekers. He meets and falls in love with the Countess Courteau. When he asks her to be his wife, he finds she has a husband. He joins a traveling show, one member of which, Laure, has fallen in love with him. She becomes hostile when he pays his attentions to Rouletta, daughter of the gambler. Laure conspires with Count Courteau, who has returned and who now believes that Phillips is his wife’s lover. Phillips then works in the trading post, weighing the gold dust of the miners. He is charged with short-changing Courteau and arrested. The Countess pretends reconciliation with her husband in  order to get the proof of Phillips’ innocence and threatens to expose him and have him driven out unless he confesses to the police. On his way to do so he is killed by one of the McCaskeys, who flee across the border. ’Poleon Doret, who has befriended Phillips, pursues with a police officer, and captures one of the brothers, proving Phillips’ innocence of the charge of murder which had been placed against him. ’Poleon and Rouletta, whom he had also  befriended, get married, leaving the way open for Phillips and the Countess to follow their example.

Cast

Preservation
Print of Winds of Chance are located at the UCLA Film and Television Archives, George Eastman House, and National Archives of Canada (at Ottawa).

See also
Trail of '98 (1928)

References

External links

Lantern slide
Stills and articles at dorothysebastian.com

1925 films
American silent feature films
American black-and-white films
Films based on American novels
Films directed by Frank Lloyd
1925 drama films
1920s adventure drama films
First National Pictures films
Films based on works by Rex Beach
American adventure drama films
1920s American films
Silent American drama films
Silent adventure drama films
1920s English-language films